Viengthong district is a district (muang) of Bolikhamsai province in central Laos.

See also
 Ban Nam Yang
 Ban Pho Kham
 Ban Chom Thong
 Ban Phon Du
 Ban Kok kham
 Ban Thad Phu Wiang
 Ban Na suang
 Ban Hin Ngon
 Ban Udom Site
 Ban Wang Hin

References

Districts of Bolikhamsai province